Making Friends is a 1936 Fleischer Studios animated short film starring Betty Boop.

Synopsis
Pudgy the Pup takes Betty Boop's advice ('Go Out and Make Friends With the World') to heart and befriends various wild animals.

Notes
 This is the first cartoon in which Betty's hair is not parted and will be like that to the end of the series.

References

External links
Making Friends at Big Cartoon DataBase.
Making Friends on YouTube.

1936 short films
Betty Boop cartoons
1930s American animated films
American black-and-white films
1936 animated films
Paramount Pictures short films
Fleischer Studios short films
Short films directed by Dave Fleischer
Animated films about dogs
1930s English-language films
American comedy short films
American animated short films